WIVM-LD, virtual channel 39 (UHF digital channel 34), is a low-powered television station licensed to Canton, Ohio, United States. WIVN-LD (virtual channel 29 and VHF digital channel 5) and WIVD-LD (virtual and UHF digital channel 26) in Newcomerstown, and WIVX-LD (virtual and VHF digital channel 13) in Akron are translators of WIVM-LD.

The stations are owned by Image Video Teleproductions, and simulcast all programming on all channels.

WIVM-LD is carried by Spectrum Cable on channel 989 in Stark County and on Massillon Cable, channel 21 and 128.  WIVN-LD is carried by Spectrum Cable on channel 15 & channel 989 in Tuscarawas, Holmes & Carroll Counties. In the Newcomerstown area, WIVN-LD is now channel 96 on Spectrum Cable.

History

WIVX-LD signed on October 6, 2008. The station was licensed to Loudonville, Ohio, and can be seen now in Akron on digital VHF channel 13. WIVX-LD, originally W65AH, was purchased from Ohio University, and simulcasts WIVM programming. Image Video purchased another Ohio University station, W69AO (channel 69 in Millersburg, Ohio), at the same time.

Prior to joining Retro TV in May 2009, they aired America One programming. All five stations are locally owned and operated. Every weekday morning, the stations carry a television simulcast of the morning drive radio show of Canton station WHBC/1480.

Digital channels

The stations' digital signals are multiplexed:

WIVX-LD digital channel 13 is now transmitting in Akron. WIVM converted to digital channel 39 in Canton/Akron in 2011 and to RF channel 34 (virtual channel 39) in 2020. WIVN-LD 29 flash cut to digital broadcasting on December 21, 2010 on channel 29, and was licensed to VHF digital channel 5 effective June 28, 2021. WIVD moved from digital channel 22 to RF channel 26 (virtual channel 26) in 2019. W69AO has converted to digital on channel 27, as W27DG-D.

References

External links
 WIVM and WIVN-TV
 
 
 
 
 

IVM-LD
This TV affiliates
Television channels and stations established in 1995
Low-power television stations in the United States
Comet (TV network) affiliates